Jezerane is a village in central Croatia, in the municipality of Brinje, in the northwestern part of Lika-Senj County. It is connected by the D23 highway.

References

Populated places in Lika-Senj County